Hans-Georg "Katsche" Schwarzenbeck (born 3 April 1948) is a German former professional footballer who played as a defender. He played in the Bundesliga from 1966 to 1981, appearing in 416 matches for Bayern Munich. He won six German league championships, three German Cups, one European Cup Winners' Cup (defeating Rangers F.C. in the final), and three consecutive European Cups (1974 defeating Atlético Madrid, 1975 defeating Leeds United, 1976 defeating AS Saint-Étienne).

In the 1974 final, Schwarzenbeck scored the equalising goal in the European Cup final match against Atlético Madrid in the last minute of extra time with a long-range effort. Bayern won the replay 4–0 two days later.

Schwarzenbeck played 44 times for Germany between 1971 and 1978. His greatest success was the victory in the 1974 World Cup, West Germany defeating the Netherlands 2–1 in the final. He also helped the national team to victory in the 1972 European Championship, defeating the USSR in the final, and to the final of the 1976 tournament, losing to Czechoslovakia on penalty kicks in the final, after extra time.

Honours

Club
Bayern Munich
 Bundesliga: 1968–69, 1971–72, 1972–73, 1973–74, 1979–80
 DFB-Pokal: 1966–67, 1968–69, 1970–71
 European Cup: 1973–74, 1974–75, 1975–76
 UEFA Cup Winners' Cup: 1966–67
 Intercontinental Cup: 1976

International
West Germany
 FIFA World Cup: 1974
 UEFA European Championship: 1972

Individual
 Bayern Munich All-time XI

See also
List of one-club men

References

1948 births
Living people
German footballers
Germany international footballers
FC Bayern Munich footballers
Association football central defenders
Footballers from Munich
1974 FIFA World Cup players
1978 FIFA World Cup players
FIFA World Cup-winning players
UEFA Euro 1972 players
UEFA Euro 1976 players
UEFA European Championship-winning players
Bundesliga players
FC Bayern Munich non-playing staff
UEFA Champions League winning players
West German footballers